Grock is a 1931 German drama film directed by Carl Boese and starring Grock, Liane Haid, and Betty Bird. Grock, a famous circus performer, appears as himself.

The film's sets were designed by the art director Robert Neppach. A separate French-language version was also released.

Cast
 Grock as Grock, himself
 Liane Haid as Bianca, seine Frau
 Betty Bird as Ines, seine Assistantin
 Max van Embden as Max van Embden, sein Partner, himself
 Harry Hardt as Graf Wettach
 Gyula Szőreghy as Der Garderobier
 Fritz Alberti as Der Auktionator
 Philipp Manning as Ein Amerikaner
 Adolf E. Licho as 1. Nichtkäufer
 Ernõ Szenes as 2. Nichtkäufer
 Paul Hörbiger as Ein ungeschickter Geldsucher
 Kurt Lilien as 1. Varietédirektor
 Julius Falkenstein as 2. Varietédirektor
 Heinz Marlow as Ein Zirkusdirektor
 Hugo Fischer-Köppe as Artist
 Gerhard Dammann as Artist
 Raffles Bill as Artist

References

Bibliography

External links 
 

1931 comedy films
German comedy films
1931 films
Films of the Weimar Republic
1930s German-language films
Films directed by Carl Boese
German multilingual films
Films about clowns
German black-and-white films
1931 multilingual films
1930s German films